Ivica Pogarčić (12 January 1947 – 2010) was a Bosnian-Herzegovinian football forward who played for FK Partizan.

Club career
Born in Zenica, SR Bosnia and Herzegovina, he started playing in Zaječar where he played four years with local side FK Timok, initially in their youth team but soon after in the senior squad competing in Serbian Republic League, Yugoslav third level. In the summer of 1967 he left Timok and joined Yugoslav giants FK Partizan. He made a total of 34 appearances and scored 25 goals at Partizan, of which 16 games and 13 goals were in the 1967–68 Yugoslav First League, one game in the Yugoslav Cup, and one game in the 1967–68 Inter-Cities Fairs Cup.

In the summer of 1968 he left Partizan and joined newly promoted Yugoslav First League side FK Bor He played with Bor two seasons, until 1970, and made 35 appearances and scored two goals. Next, he joins FK Hajduk Veljko where along Ilija Zavišić they make a fierce attacking duo. He suffered from flat feet and special boots had to be made for him.

References

1947 births
2010 deaths
Sportspeople from Zenica
Croats of Bosnia and Herzegovina
Association football forwards
Yugoslav footballers
FK Timok players
FK Partizan players
FK Bor players
Yugoslav First League players